The 1965–66 season was the 64th in the history of the Western Football League.

The champions for the second time in their history, and the second season in succession, were Welton Rovers, who completed the season unbeaten.

Final table
The league was reduced from 22 clubs to 18 after Bath City Reserves, Bristol City Reserves, Chippenham Town, Poole Town Reserves and Yeovil Town Reserves all left the league. One new club joined:

Bristol City Colts, rejoining the league after leaving in 1961.

References

1965-66
5